This is a list of orders made by the British Privy Council.

A list of all Orders in Council and Orders of Council made between July 1994 and September 2000 is held by the Privy Council Office in an Access database. The ID number used in this table is the identifier in that database.

1-100

101-200

200-301

301-400

401-500

501 to 600

601 to 700

701 to 800

801 to 900

901 to 1000

Since October 2000
Orders made since October 2000 are listed at the Privy Council website.

References 

Privy Council of the United Kingdom